The 2020 Phillips 66 Big 12 men's basketball tournament was a postseason men's basketball tournament for the Big 12 Conference. It was scheduled to be played from March 11 to 14, in Kansas City, Missouri at the Sprint Center. The winner would have received the conference's automatic bid to the 2020 NCAA tournament.

On March 11, 2020, Big 12 commissioner Bob Bowlsby announced that fans would not be allowed to attend the tournament beginning with the games on March 12 due to concerns over the COVID-19 pandemic. The two First Round games that took place on March 11 were completed with fans in attendance. The rest of the tournament was scheduled to be completed without fans in attendance. The following day, the conference announced it had cancelled the tournament completely. Later that same day, the NCAA Tournament was canceled before the conference named their automatic bid.

Seeds
All 10 conference teams were slated to participate in the tournament. The top six teams earned a first round bye.
	
Teams were be seeded by record within the conference, with a tiebreaker system to seed teams with identical conference records.

Schedule

Bracket

References

Tournament
Big 12 men's basketball tournament
Big 12 men's basketball tournament
Basketball competitions in Kansas City, Missouri
College sports tournaments in Missouri
Big 12 men's basketball tournament
Big 12 men's basketball tournament